The term Rajoy government may refer to:

Rajoy I Government, the government of Spain under Mariano Rajoy from 2011 to 2016.
Rajoy II Government, the government of Spain under Mariano Rajoy from 2016 to 2018.